Andrew McMahon (18 March 1920 – 26 April 2005) was a British Labour politician. He was the Member of Parliament for Glasgow Govan from 1979 to 1983, when he retired due to constituency boundary changes. His successor was Bruce Millan.

References
Times Guide to the House of Commons 1979

External links
 

 

1920 births
2005 deaths
Scottish Labour MPs
UK MPs 1979–1983
Members of the Parliament of the United Kingdom for Glasgow constituencies
Politicians from Glasgow
Place of birth missing
Place of death missing